Arichanna pryeraria is a moth of the  family Geometridae. It is found in Japan and Taiwan.

The wingspan is 38–42 mm.

References

Moths described in 1891
Boarmiini
Moths of Japan
Moths of Taiwan